Koksan Airport is an airport near Koksan, Hwanghae-bukto, North Korea.

Facilities 
The airfield has a single concrete runway 06/24 measuring 8190 x 141 feet (2496 x 43 m).  It has a full-length parallel taxiway with two aprons at the ends, as well as a taxiway leading southwest to dispersed aircraft stands.  It is in close proximity to several other airfields including Koksan South Highway Strip 1 & 2, Pyonsul Li, and Wongyo Ri.  It is home to a fighter regiment of 24 MiG-21 jets.

References 

Airports in North Korea
North Hwanghae